Pietro Perreau (27 October 1827 – 1911) was an Italian librarian and Hebraist.

Biography
Pietro Perreau was born in Piacenza on 27 October 1827. His father was an engineer with origins in Franche-Comté, and his mother a member of the local aristocracy. He studied in the Alberoni College of his native town from 1844 to 1849, and continued to study philology and philosophy until 1853.

Perreau was appointed director of the Landiana Library in his native city in 1857. Three years later, he was placed at the head of the Oriental collection in the National Library of Parma, of which he was made chief librarian in 1876. Notably, Perreau was one of two vice-presidents at the Fourth International Congress of Orientalists in Florence in 1878.

Though himself a Catholic priest, he was an avowed philosemite who published historical, literary and scientific studies in various Jewish journals, including the Antologia Israelitica and the Vessillo Israelitico. Prior to 1860 Perreau had written on various subjects, but from then on he devoted himself exclusively to rabbinical Jewish literature.

Among other works, Perreau published a polygraphic edition of the commentary of Immanuel of Rome on the Psalms (Parma, 1879–82), on Esther (1880), and on Lamentations (1881). He also published the Ma'amar Gan 'Eden of Rabbi Ḥayyim Israel, in the Zunz Jubelschrift, and Oceano dello abbreviature e sigle ebraiche, caldaiche, rabbiniche, talmudiche, cabalistiche, geographiche, etc. (Parma, 1883; polygraphic edition), a lexicon of Hebrew abbreviations.

Selected publications

 
 
  Originally published in Il Buonarroti, 1873.

References
 

1827 births
1911 deaths
19th-century Italian Roman Catholic priests
Christian Hebraists
Italian Hebraists
People from Piacenza